The MLW World Women's Featherweight Championship is a women's professional wrestling championship created and promoted by the American professional wrestling promotion Major League Wrestling (MLW). The current champion is Taya Valkyrie who is in her first reign.

History
MLW previously teased the formation of a women's division on August 18, 2019, later announcing its official launch on October 18, 2019. The division's first official match was held at MLW Blood and Thunder of 2019 between Zeda Zhang and The Spider Lady which Zhang was successful at winning via disqualification.

Following MLW coming back from a lengthy hiatus due to the COVID-19 pandemic, on July 7, 2021, it was announced that Shimmer Women Athletes co-founder Dave Prazak had joined MLW to help relaunch its women's division. On the September 22, 2021, episode of Fusion: Alpha, MLW officially announced the launch of its MLW women's featherweight division and introduced the first wrestlers on the roster, including Brittany Blake, Holidead, Nicole Savoy, The Sea Stars (Ashley Vox and Delmi Exo), Willow Nightingale and Zoey Skye.

On April 21, 2022, it was announced that on May 13, 2022, at Kings of Colosseum that there will be a match between Taya Valkyrie and Holidead to determine who the first ever MLW Women's Featherweight Championship title holder is. During the match, Taya defeated Holidead via submission to become the inaugural championship holder.

Sometime during Taya Valkyrie's reign, the title's name was changed from the MLW Women's Featherweight Championship to the MLW World Women's Featherweight Championship according to MLW's official website.

Reigns

Names

See also 
World Women's Championship (disambiguation)

References

External links
MLW World Women's Featherweight Championship Title History at Cagematch.net

Women's
Women's professional wrestling championships
2022 introductions